Zoropsidae, also known as false wolf spiders for their physical similarity to wolf spiders, is a family of cribellate araneomorph spiders first described by Philipp Bertkau in 1882. They can be distinguished from wolf spiders by their two rows of eyes that are more equal in size than those of Lycosidae. 

The families Tengellidae and Zorocratidae are now included in Zoropsidae.

Genera
, the World Spider Catalog accepts the following genera:

Akamasia Bosselaers, 2002 – Cyprus
Anachemmis Chamberlin, 1919 – United States, Mexico
Austrotengella Raven, 2012 – Australia
Birrana Raven & Stumkat, 2005 – Australia
Cauquenia Piacentini, Ramírez & Silva, 2013
Chinja Polotow & Griswold, 2018 – Tanzania
Ciniflella Mello-Leitão, 1921 – Brazil
Devendra Lehtinen, 1967 – Sri Lanka
Griswoldia Dippenaar-Schoeman & Jocqué, 1997 – South Africa
Hoedillus Simon, 1898 – Guatemala, Nicaragua
Huntia Gray & Thompson, 2001 – Australia
Itatiaya Mello-Leitão, 1915 – Brazil
Kilyana Raven & Stumkat, 2005 – Australia
Krukt Raven & Stumkat, 2005 – Australia
Lauricius Simon, 1888 – Mexico, United States
Liocranoides Keyserling, 1881 – United States
Megateg Raven & Stumkat, 2005 – Australia
Phanotea Simon, 1896 – South Africa
Pseudoctenus Caporiacco, 1949 – Kenya, Burundi, Malawi
Socalchemmis Platnick & Ubick, 2001 – United States, Mexico
Takeoa Lehtinen, 1967 – China, Korea, Japan
Tengella Dahl, 1901 – Mexico, Central America
Titiotus Simon, 1897 – United States
Uliodon L. Koch, 1873 – New Zealand, Australia
Wiltona Koçak & Kemal, 2008 – New Zealand
Zorocrates Simon, 1888 – United States, Mexico, El Salvador
Zoropsis Simon, 1878 – Asia, Europe, Africa, United States

See also
 List of Zoropsidae species

References

External links

 

 
Araneomorphae families
Taxa named by Philipp Bertkau